The 2009–10 Biathlon World Cup – World Cup 5 was the fifth event of the season and was held in Ruhpolding, Germany from Wednesday, January 13 until Sunday, January 17, 2010.

Schedule of events
The schedule of the event is below

Medal winners

Men

Women

Achievements
 Best performance for all time

 , 6 place in Sprint and 5 place in Mass start
 , 16 place in Sprint
 , 61 place in Sprint
 , 27 place in Sprint
 , 38 place in Sprint
 , 41 place in Sprint
 , 64 place in Sprint
 , 98 place in Sprint

 First World Cup race

 , 19 place in Sprint
 , 41 place in Sprint
 , 101 place in Sprint
 , 76 place in Sprint
 , 77 place in Sprint
 , 109 place in Sprint

References

- World Cup 5, 2009-10 Biathlon World Cup
Biathlon
2010 in German sport
2010 in Bavaria
Biathlon competitions in Germany
Sports competitions in Bavaria